The 1931 New South Wales Rugby Football League premiership was the twenty-fourth season of Sydney’s top-level rugby league club competition, Australia’s first. During the season, which lasted from April until September, eight teams from across the city contested the premiership which culminated in a grand final between minor premiers Eastern Suburbs and South Sydney.

Season summary
The NSWRFL banned radio broadcasting of its matches in 1931 on the grounds that it was affecting the gates. After a year of broadcasts from nearby rooftops and ladders outside the grounds the League rescinded their ban.

Teams
 Balmain, formed on January 23, 1908, at Balmain Town Hall
 Eastern Suburbs, formed on January 24, 1908, at Paddington Town Hall
 Newtown, formed on January 14, 1908
 North Sydney, formed on February 7, 1908
 South Sydney, formed on January 17, 1908, at Redfern Town Hall
 St. George, formed on November 8, 1920, at Kogarah School of Arts
 Western Suburbs, formed on February 4, 1908
 University, formed in 1919 at Sydney University

Ladder

Finals

Grand Final

Eastern Suburbs started the match as short-priced favourites, and ran with the breeze from the western end after their captain Pope won the toss. With  Dick Brown dominating the scrums, Eastern Suburbs attacked early. The first points came at the twenty-minute mark when Lynch kicked a goal after O’Connor was penalised in front of the posts. He missed another attempt two minutes later but Easts went further ahead when Lynch kicked another goal, from a drop kick. Benny Wearing had his chance for South Sydney but was pulled down from behind by Dave Brown two yards from the line. At halftime Eastern Suburbs led 4–0.

Five-minutes after the break South Sydney seized control of the match. They attacked desperately as Treweeke, Curran and then Root hurled themselves at the Eastern Suburbs line. A scrum followed and with an overlap out wide Wearing crossed unopposed in the corner. The winger then converted his own try to give South Sydney a 5–4 lead. Eastern Suburbs then hit back with a remarkable try. Billy Hong gathered in his own twenty-five yard area, stepped through the defence to halfway, passed to Tottey who beat Morrison in a race for the ball. Dave Brown missed the goal, Eastern Suburbs led 7–5. South Sydney fullback Spillane then landed a goal from two yards on his own side of halfway to level the score at 7–all.

Hong then went off after twisting an ankle, Eastern Suburbs struggled to contend with the extra man in South Sydney's backline. Chances followed for both sides – South Sydney's winger, Why, was thrown out at the corner post, Morrison lost possession close to the line and Brown missed with a penalty.

With only minutes left and scores locked at 7–all, South Sydney five-eighth Harry Eyres seized possession inside Eastern Suburbs quarter, stood still for a split second, then with an electrifying burst of speed exploded through the converging defence. He beat the ineffective tackle of Hong (who had come back onto the field) and with the referee accidentally getting in the way of Brown coming over in cover defence for Eastern Suburbs, Eyres crossed for the match winning try. Hong then collapsed and had to be carried from the field as Williams was converting the try.

It was widely claimed as one of the most thrilling Grand Finals in the short history of the game in Sydney.

South Sydney 12
Tries: Wearing, Eyres. Goals: Wearing, Williams, Spillane

Eastern Suburbs 7
Tries: Tottey. Goals: Lynch (2)

References

External links
 Rugby League Tables - Notes AFL Tables
 Rugby League Tables - Season 1931 AFL Tables
 Premiership History and Statistics RL1908
 History of the New South Wales Rugby League Finals, by Steve Haddan
 The Rugby League News
 Results: 1931-40 at rabbitohs.com.au

New South Wales Rugby League premiership
NSWRFL season